Trismelasmos elegans is a moth in the family Cossidae. It was described by Roepke in 1955. It is found in New Guinea. The species seems to prefer lowland areas.

References

Zeuzerinae
Moths described in 1955